The Bradfords Group is a building supplies company with headquarters in Yeovil, Somerset. The business trades as Bradfords Building Supplies and Yeovil Plumbing Supplies in over 40 UK locations. In the year just ended (2018-2019)

History 

There were Bradfords in Wiltshire from at least the 16th century. William Bradford, who was born in 1750 and lived at Thorney, married Ann Richards in 1782: she worked with her husband in running their business, which included coal merchants and quarries, until he died in 1806. Shortly after this she was joined by her son Job until her death in 1819.

In 1853 the Great Western Railway line was opened from Taunton to Yeovil, and Jabez Bradford started the Yeovil branch of the business. GWR came to an agreement with the Bradford family for sidings to be built near Yeovil Station; Jabez would be mayor of Yeovil from 1880-1882.

References

External links 
 Bradford Building Supplies

Companies based in Yeovil
Building materials companies of the United Kingdom